Gordon Richard Hoffman (born ) is an American screenwriter and director. He is the older brother of  actor Philip Seymour Hoffman.

Biography

Early life
His mother, Marilyn O'Connor (née Loucks), a native of Waterloo, New York, is a family court judge and lawyer. His father, Gordon Stowell Hoffman, is a former Xerox executive. He has two sisters, Jill and Emily, in addition to his late brother Philip. His parents divorced in 1976.

Film
In 2002, he wrote the screenplay for the film Love Liza, about a man dealing with his wife's suicide. The Guardian Peter Bradshaw described it as a "very melancholy evening in the cinema ... an intelligent and harrowing movie," while Ed Gonzalez from Slant Magazine disparagingly wrote: "Love Liza will have a difficult time distinguishing itself from Alexander Payne's About Schmidt, another widower-in-chaos comedy starring [Kathy] Bates in an undervalued role. Love Liza is nowhere near as condescending but its shrill pitch makes it just as difficult to take." The film received the Waldo Salt Screenwriting Award at the 2002 Sundance Film Festival.

Hoffman is the founder of the BlueCat Screenplay Competition—for finding and fostering undiscovered writing talent. The winning screenplay from the 2005 competition, Balls Out: Gary the Tennis Coach, was purchased by Greenestreet Films, and was released in 2009.

He taught graduate screenwriting at the USC School of Cinematic Arts.

References

External links 
 

1964 births
American male screenwriters
Living people
Place of birth missing (living people)
People from Waterloo, New York
University of Southern California faculty
Screenwriters from New York (state)
Screenwriters from California